The following is a timeline of the history of the city of Chihuahua, Mexico.

Prior to 20th century

 1707 - Settlement founded by Francisco Munoz.
 1709 - "San Francisco de Cuellar" community founded by Antonio de Deza y Ulloa.
 1718 - Settlement named "San Felipe el Real de Chihuahua."
 1717 - Church of Saint Francis of Assisi construction begins.
 1721 - Royal House built.
 1731 - Santa Rita Church built.
 1763 - Population: nearly 5000.
 1789 - Church of San Francisco building completed.
 1791 - Population: 4,077.
 1811 - Execution of Miguel Hidalgo y Costilla early in the Mexican War of Independence.
 1821 - Population: 4,441.
 1826
 Church of Saint Francis of Assisi construction completed.
 Guadalupe Church built.
 1835 - Literary and Scientific Institute of Chihuahua founded.
 1847
 February 28: Battle of the Sacramento River occurs near town.
 March: Town taken by United States forces under command of Alexander William Doniphan and Sterling Price.
 1864 - Benito Juárez makes the town temporary capital of Mexico.
 1882 - Paso del Norte-Chihuahua City railroad begins operating.
 1891
 Government Palace of Chihuahua built.
 Catholic Diocese of Chihuahua established.
 1895 - Population: 18,279.
 1900 - Population: 30,405.

20th century

 1902 - El Correo de Chihuahua newspaper begins publication.
 1905 - American Smelting and Refining Company facility built (approximate date).
 1907
 City Hall of Chihuahua built.
 Francisco Villa Museum built.
 1908 - March 1: Banco Minero robbed.
 1910
 Museo Casa Chihuahua (known as the Federal Palace) rebuilding completed.
 Quinta Gameros mansion built.
 1913 - Headquarters of Pancho Villa established in city.
 1921 - Antonio Guizar y Valencia becomes Catholic bishop of Chihuahua.
 1926 - Escuela Benito Juárez (school) active.
 1927 - El Heraldo newspaper begins publication.
 1947 - El Mexicano newspaper begins publication.
 1948 - Chihuahua Institute of Technology established.
 1949 - Del Real Hotel built.
 1954 - University of Chihuahua established.
 1961 - Ferrocarril Chihuahua al Pacífico (tourist railway) opened
 1969 - Adalberto Almeida y Merino becomes Catholic archbishop of Chihuahua.
 1972 - Museo Casa Juárez established.
 1975 - Legislature building constructed.
 1981 - Telmex Tower built.
 1986 - July: Local election.
 1990 - Catholic Pope John Paul II visits city.
 1997 - Archivo Histórico del Instituto Chihuahuense de la Cultura established.
 1998 - Gate to Chihuahua sculpture installed.
 2000 - Punto Alto built.

21st century

 2001 - Tribunales Federales building constructed.
 2002 - Alejandro Cano Ricaud becomes municipal president.
 2003 - Angel of Liberty monument erected.
 2004 - Juan Blanco Zaldivar becomes municipal president.
 2005 - International Festival of Chihuahua begins.
 2006 - Museo Casa Chihuahua opens.
 2008 - Nordam Mexico in business.
 2010
 June: Attack on Faith and Life Center.
 Álvaro Madero Muñoz becomes municipal president, succeeded by Marco Adán Quezada Martínez.
 Population: 809,232; metro 852,533.
 2011 - Monument Tower built.
 2012
 Centro Cultural Bicentenario inaugurated.
 Cenit Tower built.
 2013 - July: Javier Garfio Pacheco elected municipal president.
 2017 - March: Journalist Miroslava Breach Velducea is shot and killed by a gunman as she drives away from her home.

See also
 Chihuahua history (city)
 List of municipal presidents of Chihuahua
 Chihuahua (state) history
 History of Chihuahua state (in Spanish)

References

This article incorporates information from the Spanish Wikipedia.

Bibliography

in English
Published in the 19th century
 
 
 

Published in the 20th century
 
 
 
 
 
 
 
  (fulltext via OpenLibrary)
  (fulltext via OpenLibrary)
 
 

Published in the 21st century

in Spanish

External links

 
 Europeana. Items related to Chihuahua, Mexico, various dates.
 Digital Public Library of America. Items related to Chihuahua, Mexico, various dates

 
Chihuahua
Chihuahua City